The Park Drive 600 was an invitational professional snooker tournament, which took place on 28 and 29 April 1971 at the St Phillips Social Club in Sheffield with six professional players participating. Reardon claimed the title with a 4–0 victory against Spencer in the final, making a break of 129 during the match.

There was £600 prize money for the winner, on a "winner takes all" basis. Additionally, there was a prize of £1 per point for the highest break achieved. The tournament was broadcast on Yorkshire Television in weekly programmes.

The first round matches and semi-finals were each decided on the aggregate score across three frames. Pulman defeated Rea by 10 points after taking the last three colours in their second frame, and Williams eliminated Davis by winning 184–165 on the final . In the first semi-final, Spencer won 228–134 against Pulman.

Main draw
Players in bold denote match winners.

References

1971 in snooker
1971 in English sport